is a Japanese actress and model, currently affiliated to Oscar Promotion.

Career
Takahashi rose to fame after participating in the 14th Japan Bishōjo Contest in 2014, in which she won the Grand Prix among 80,131 applicants, 1428 who passed the primary document examination and 21 finalists. During the main competition held on August 5 at Grand Prince Hotel New Takanawa, she sang Erika Sawajiri's "Taiyou no Uta". On December 17, she participated in Oscar Promotion's annual kimono photo session, held at the Meiji Memorial Hall.

In February 2015, Takahashi starred in a commercial by the Japanese Consumers' Co-operative Union and Yoyogi Seminar. At the same time, she starred in drama film Jinsei no Yakusoku. On September 13, she was appointed Public Relations Manager of Shiga Prefecture. On October 13, she was appointed the ambassador for Hie Shrine.

On January 23, 2016, Takahashi attended the Shiga-Lake Biwa Rainbow's Luck Festival as ambassador of Shiga. During the 41st Hochi Film Award, she was nominated Best New Artist for starring in Jinsei no Yakusoku. On December 8, she participated in Oscar Promotion's annual kimono photo session.

In February 2017, Takahashi moved to Tokyo with her mother. On March 4, she attended the "One Day EVENT Shiga Ward" at the AQUA CiTY ODAIBA. On April 19, she was chosen winner of the second Black Hair Beauty Award organized by Yanagiya Honten.

Filmography

Films

Television dramas

Advertisements

Music videos

Video games

References

External links
 Official website
 Official blog (beamie)
 HIkaru Takahashi on Ameba

Japanese female models
21st-century Japanese actresses
Actors from Shiga Prefecture
2001 births
Living people